Two Nudes Bathing is a 1995 short film created as part of the Showtime television series, Picture Windows.  It was written, produced and directed by John Boorman, other producers include Scott JT Frank, Dan Halperin, and David Wachs. The film stars John Hurt and was screened in the Un Certain Regard section at the 1995 Cannes Film Festival.

Cast
 John Hurt as Marquis de Prey
 Charley Boorman as The Painter
 Angeline Ball as Simone
 Jocelyne West as Gabrielle
 Juliette Caton as Blanche
 Britta Bates as Nana

References

External links

1995 films
1995 short films
British short films
Films directed by John Boorman
1990s English-language films